Malching (Oberbay) station is a railway station in the Malching district of the municipality of Maisach, located in the district of Fürstenfeldbruck in Upper Bavaria, Germany.

References

External links

Munich S-Bahn stations
Railway stations in Bavaria
Buildings and structures in Fürstenfeldbruck (district)